Erfurt Cathedral (officially Hohe Domkirche St. Marien zu Erfurt, English: Cathedral Church of St Mary at Erfurt), also known as St Mary's Cathedral, is the largest and oldest church building in the Thuringian city of Erfurt, central Germany. It is the episcopal seat of the Roman Catholic Diocese of Erfurt. The cathedral was mainly built in the International Gothic style and is located on a hillside overlooking the main town square (Cathedral Square), directly next to St Severus' Church. As a unique architectural ensemble, both churches together form the city's landmark.

History 
The site of the present cathedral has been the location of many other Christian buildings, for example a Romanesque basilica and a church hall. In 742, Saint Boniface erected a church on the mound where Erfurt Cathedral is now sited. In the mid-12th century, the foundations of the original church were used for a Romanesque basilica. In the early 14th century, the mound was enlarged to make room for St Mary's Cathedral.

Martin Luther was ordained in the cathedral on 3 April 1507.

Architecture 
The architecture of Erfurt Cathedral is mainly Gothic and originates from the 14th and 15th centuries. The building has many notable architectural features, including the stained glass windows and the interior furnishings. The central spire of the cathedral's three towers houses the Maria Gloriosa which, at the time of its casting by Geert van Wou in 1497, was the world's largest free-swinging bell. It is the largest surviving medieval bell in the world. It is known for the purity of its tone.

Relics and treasures 
The cathedral houses many rare and rich furnishings and sculptures, including the tomb of the supposedly bigamous Count von Gleichen, accompanied by both of his wives, a stucco altar from around 1160, a bronze candelabra called Erfurter Wolfram, the oldest free standing cast work in Germany, and, out on the portal, statues of the Wise and Foolish Virgins.

Bells

See also 
 St. Augustine's Monastery (Erfurt)
Predigerkirche (Erfurt)
 Architecture of cathedrals and great churches

References

External links 
 
  (in German) 

Cathedral
Judensau
Roman Catholic churches in Thuringia
Roman Catholic cathedrals in Germany
Heritage sites in Thuringia
Gothic hall churches in Germany